This is a list of head men's basketball coaches at the University of Wisconsin–Madison:

# Denotes interim head coach.

References

Wisconsin

Wisconsin Badgers basketball coaches